David Vidales Ajenjo (born 1 May 2002) is a Spanish racing driver set to race in the 2023 Super Formula Lights with B-Max Racing. He was a race winner in the FIA Formula 3 Championship for Campos Racing.

Career

Karting 
Vidales started karting in 2013 where he won the Spanish Karting Championship, he won it for the 2nd time the following year. In 2017 Vidales joined the Tony Kart racing team where he finished 3rd in the WSK Final Cup and then in the same year he came runner up in the CIK-FIA World Championship beating the likes of FIA Formula 3 driver Clément Novalak, former Ferrari Driver Academy driver Gianluca Petecof and British F3 driver Ulysse de Pauw. Vidales then finished 3rd in the Kart World Cup in 2018 and then managed to improve by one place in 2019.

Formula Renault Eurocup 
In late July 2020, Vidales management team announced he’d be joining JD Motorsport for the second round in Imola. In his first professional single seater race Vidales put his car on pole for the 1st race. He pulled away from Finnish teammate William Alatalo, despite a couple of safety cars Vidales kept in front and won his first ever single seater race. In the 2nd race, JD Motorsport locked out the front row, Vidales starting in 2nd, however he jumped Alatalo at the start and from that point he controlled the race and won once again. Vidales would finish on the podium a further three times throughout the campaign, and finished sixth in the overall championship standings and second in the rookie standings, only behind Alex Quinn.

Formula Regional European Championship 

In December 2020, Vidales switched to Prema Powerteam to contest the 2021 season following the merger between Formula Renault Eurocup and the Formula Regional European Championship. The Spaniard won the first race of the season at Imola, having dominated the race with pole position and every lap led.

FIA Formula 3 Championship 
Vidales joined Campos Racing for the 2022 F3 season, after testing with them the previous year in post-season testing.

Formula One 
In November 2016, Vidales partook in a test with the Ferrari Driver Academy alongside Tony Kart teammate Marcus Armstrong.

Super Formula 
At the end of 2022, Vidales partook in a Super Formula test with B-Max Racing. In March 2023, the team announced that Vidales would switch from Formula 3 to Super Formula Lights for the 2023 season.

Karting record

Karting career summary

Racing record

Racing career summary

Complete Formula Renault Eurocup results 
(key) (Races in bold indicate pole position) (Races in italics indicate fastest lap)

Complete F3 Asian Championship results 
(key) (Races in bold indicate pole position) (Races in italics indicate fastest lap)

Complete Formula Regional European Championship results 
(key) (Races in bold indicate pole position) (Races in italics indicate fastest lap)

Complete FIA Formula 3 Championship results 
(key) (Races in bold indicate pole position; races in italics indicate points for the fastest lap of top ten finishers)

References

External links 
 
 

2002 births
Living people
Sportspeople from León, Spain
Spanish racing drivers
Formula Renault Eurocup drivers
JD Motorsport drivers
Prema Powerteam drivers
FIA Formula 3 Championship drivers
Campos Racing drivers
Formula Regional European Championship drivers
F3 Asian Championship drivers
Karting World Championship drivers
B-Max Racing drivers